The government of Ignacio González was formed on 28 September 2012, following the latter's election as President of the Community of Madrid by the Assembly of Madrid on 26 September and his swearing-in on 27 September, as a result of the resignation of the former president, Esperanza Aguirre, out of personal motives.

The cabinet comprised members of the PP and a number of independents. It was automatically dismissed on 25 May 2015 as a consequence of the 2015 regional election, but remained in acting capacity until the next government was sworn in.

Investiture

Cabinet changes
González's government saw a number of cabinet changes during its tenure:

 On 27 January 2014, Minister of Health Javier Fernández-Lasquetty announced his resignation from the post after a decision from the Superior Court of Justice of Madrid to maintain the precautionary suspension of the outsourcing process of six public hospitals in Madrid. He was replaced by Javier Rodríguez.
 On 4 December 2014, Javier Rodríguez was dismissed as Health minister after being questioned by health professionals and the opposition for a number of controversial statements on the Ebola-infected nurse during the virus disease crisis in Spain. He was replaced in his post by Javier Maldonado.

From 25 May 2015, González's cabinet took on acting duties for the duration of the government formation process resulting from the 2015 regional election.
 On 4 June, two ministers renounced their posts: Salvador Victoria (Presidency, Justice and Spokesperson) and Lucía Figar (Education, Youth and Sports), who had been indicted for their alleged involvement in the Púnica case. They were replaced four days later in acting capacity by Javier Hernández Martínez and Manuel Pérez Gómez, respectively.

Council of Government
The Council of Government was structured into the office for the president of the Community of Madrid and eight ministries.

Notes

References

2012 establishments in the Community of Madrid
2015 disestablishments in the Community of Madrid
Cabinets established in 2012
Cabinets disestablished in 2015
Cabinets of the Community of Madrid